Florence Lake (1904–1980) was an American film actress.

Florence Lake may also refer to:

 Florence Lake Dam in California
 Upper Florence Lake and Lower Florence Lake in the Alpine Lakes Wilderness
 Florence Lake School No. 3 in North Dakota
 Lake Florence (Brevard County, Florida)
 Lake Florence (Florida)